Mark King (born 6 June 1988) is an English former professional footballer. He had previously been signed on non-contract terms at Northwich Victoria F.C. after being released by Accrington Stanley at the end of the 2007–2008 season, however he left Northwich in September 2008.

Career

He started his career at Blackburn Rovers after coming through the youth system and then into the reserves. However, he failed to make an appearance for the first team side at Ewood Park in the Premier League, mainly because he sustained two serious knee injuries.

He was signed by Football League Two side Accrington Stanley on 11 January 2008 on a free transfer. He first caught the eye of John Coleman when he featured for Blackburn Rovers in a training match against Accrington in a training match in December 2007. King can play at left-back or centre-back. He made his league debut in the 2–0 loss to Stockport County.cc. He went on to play 68 games for the league two side

References

External links

1988 births
Living people
English footballers
Blackburn Rovers F.C. players
Accrington Stanley F.C. players
Northwich Victoria F.C. players
Association football midfielders